The State of Malta, commonly known as Malta, was the predecessor to the modern-day Republic of Malta. It existed between 21 September 1964 and 13 December 1974.

The Crown Colony of Malta became independent under the Malta Independence Act 1964 passed by the British Parliament. Under the new Constitution of Malta, approved in a referendum held in May of that year, Queen Elizabeth II became the queen of Malta. Her constitutional roles were delegated to the governor-general of Malta. Between 1964 and 1974, Elizabeth II visited Malta once, in November 1967.

Governors-general
The following governors-general held office in Malta between 1964 and 1974:

Sir Maurice Henry Dorman (21 September 1964 – 4 July 1971)
Sir Anthony Mamo (4 July 1971 – 13 December 1974)

Prime ministers
The following held office as prime minister (and head of government) of the State of Malta during this period:

Giorgio Borġ Olivier (September 21, 1964 – 21 June 1971)
Dom Mintoff (21 June 1971 – 22 December 1984)

Transition to republic
On 13 December 1974, following amendments to the Constitution by the Labour government of Dom Mintoff, the monarchy was abolished and Malta became a republic within the Commonwealth with the function of head of state vested in a president appointed by Parliament. The last governor-general, Sir Anthony Mamo, was appointed the first president of Malta.

References

History of Malta
Malta
 01
Government of Malta
Malta and the Commonwealth of Nations
1960s in Malta
1970s in Malta
1960s in the British Empire
1970s in the British Empire
City-states
Politics of Malta
1964 establishments in Malta
1974 disestablishments in Malta
1964 establishments in the British Empire
1974 disestablishments in the British Empire
Monarchy
States and territories established in 1964
States and territories disestablished in 1974